Damarcheruvu is a village in Medak district, Telangana state, India. This village received  best gramam  award two times . Damarcheruvu belongs to ramayampet mandal. It is homeland of many farmers.the village is really inspiring by inculcating hygiene practices and  promoting toilet for every home.

Villages in Medak district